Spanish league may refer to:

Sports
 Liga de Fútbol Profesional (Professional Football League), commonly known as La Liga, Primera División, and the "Spanish League," the professional football league in Spain
Liga ACB, men's basketball
Liga Femenina de Baloncesto, women's basketball

Others
 League (unit)#Spain, Spanish league, an archaic unit of measurement